HMS Pearl was a Pearl-class 21-gun screw corvette of the Royal Navy launched in 1855, displacing 2,187 tons.

In September 1857, during the Indian Rebellion, 175 of the ship's crew were formed into Pearls Naval Brigade. The small force, armed largely with rifles, took part in several actions.

The ship was captained by Edward Southwell Sotheby from its commission in 1855. John Borlase replaced Sotheby, on the ships return from India in 1859, from 23 August 1859 to 18 June 1864 when the ship was paid off in Portsmouth. Pearl sailed around the East Indies and China and played a part in the Taiping Rebellion and the bombardment of Kagoshima during the Anglo-Satsuma War.

North Star affair
In May 1861 the Pearl was involved in an incident involving a British merchant ship named North Star and Chinese pirates. On 13 May, pirates in a junk attacked North Star off the coast of Hong Kong Island. They killed or mortally wounded at least five members of the crew and stole over 4,000 dollars worth of gold before abandoning the ship. Only two survivors remained on the ship. They hid from the pirates until they left North Star, and then set sail for the port of Hong Kong. Pearl was anchored off Green Island at the time and she eventually recovered both North Star and the survivors.

References
Notes

Bibliography

External links
 Record of service at the Naval Database website

 

Pearl-class corvettes
1855 ships
Ships built in Woolwich
Indian Rebellion of 1857
Boshin War